This is a list of 3D-enabled mobile phones. The devices on this list typically use autostereoscopic displays. Some devices may use other kinds of display technology, like holographic displays or multiscopic displays. Some devices employ eye tracking in aiming the 3D effect to the viewer's eye.

List of 3D-enabled mobile phones

List of 3D Video Players

See also 
List of mobile phone games with 3D display support
Nintendo 3DS
List of NFC-enabled mobile devices
Projector phone
LEIA Inc
3D Printing

References

External links
 3D Video Collections For 3D DEVICES Divided by categories (version available for all Desktops, Smartphones, Tablets and above SmartTV 3D)
  Mobiles by categories
 Global 3D-Enabled Smartphones Industry
  Apple iPhone SE (2020)

Stereoscopy
3D-enabled mobile phones